Eeva Maria Therman-Patau (1916–2004) was a Finnish-born American geneticist. She worked to characterize the effects and cytogenetics of trisomy 13 and trisomy 18, two rare and usually fatal genetic disorders caused by an extra copy of chromosome 13 and 18, respectively.
Her works include Human Chromosomes: Structure, Behavior, Effects, a textbook on cytogenetics which is in its 4th edition. Her research specialties included X-inactivation in mammals and chromosomal abnormalities in cancer.

She received her PhD from the University of Helsinki in 1947. She emigrated to the United States in 1958, and shortly thereafter began to work as a research assistant in Klaus Patau's laboratory in the Department of Genetics at the University of Wisconsin–Madison. Three years later, she married Patau. Due to university hiring rules, she was unable to become faculty until Patau's death in 1975. She retired in 1986, and returned to Finland in 2002.

References

1916 births
2004 deaths
American geneticists
Finnish geneticists
American women geneticists
20th-century American physicians
21st-century American physicians